The Sărata is a left tributary of the river Olt in Romania. It flows into the Olt in Porumbacu de Jos.

References

Rivers of Romania
Rivers of Sibiu County